This is the discography of jazz musician and composer Wynton Marsalis.

As leader

Studio albums

Collaborative studio albums

Live albums

Compilation albums

Soundtrack albums

As sideman
With Art Blakey
 Live at Montreux and Northsea (Timeless, 1980)
 Art Blakey in Sweden (Amigo, 1981)
 Album of the Year (Timeless, 1981)
 Straight Ahead (Concord, 1981)
 Keystone 3 (Concord Jazz, 1982)
 Live At Bubba's Jazz Restaurant (Who's Who in Jazz, 1983)

With Chico Freeman
 Destiny's Dance (Contemporary, 1982) – recorded in 1981
With Branford Marsalis
 Mo' Better Blues (soundtrack) (Columbia, 1990)
 The Beautyful Ones Are Not Yet Born (album) (Sony, 1991)
 Romare Bearden Revealed (Marsalis Music, 2003)
With Dizzy Gillespie
 To Diz with Love (Telarc, 1992)
With Herbie Hancock
 Quartet (CBS/Sony, 1982) – recorded in 1981
With Joe Henderson
 Lush Life: The Music of Billy Strayhorn (1992) – recorded in 1991
With Shirley Horn 
 You Won't Forget Me (1991, Verve)
Here's to Life (1992, Verve)
With Elvin Jones
 Tribute to John Coltrane "A Love Supreme" (Columbia, 1992)
With the Modern Jazz Quartet
 MJQ & Friends: A 40th Anniversary Celebration (Atlantic, 1994)
With Frank Morgan
Mood Indigo (Antilles, 1989)
With Ted Nash
 Rhyme & Reason (Arabesque, 1999)
With Marcus Roberts
 Deep in the Shed (credited as E. Dankworth) (Novus, 1990)
With The Sachal Ensemble
 Song of Lahore (Universal, 2016)

References

External links
Wynton Marsalis Discography

Jazz discographies
Discographies of American artists